Cristian Andrés Dájome Arboleda (born 3 January 1994) is a Colombian professional footballer who plays as a winger for Major League Soccer club Vancouver Whitecaps FC.

Career

Whitecaps FC
On 17 January 2020, Whitecaps FC acquired Cristian Dájome from Colombian club Atlético Nacional with the use of Targeted Allocation Money - pending receipt of his International Transfer Certificate (ITC), medical, work permit, and visa. Dájome agreed to an MLS contract through 2021 with an option for 2022.

Honours

Club 
Vancouver Whitecaps
 Canadian Championship: 2022

Career statistics

1.MLS Cup playoffs

References

External links
 

1994 births
Living people
Colombian footballers
Categoría Primera A players
Bogotá FC footballers
Cúcuta Deportivo footballers
Deportes Tolima footballers
Atlético Nacional footballers
Deportivo Pasto footballers
América de Cali footballers
C.S.D. Independiente del Valle footballers
Vancouver Whitecaps FC players
Footballers from Bogotá
Association football forwards
Major League Soccer players